Helicobasidium longisporum (syn: H. mompa) is a Basidiomycete fungal pathogen of plants, which is the cause of violet root rot. The name Violet root rot refers to the dark purple color of the mycelial mats formed on the infected plants, usually at or below the soil line. It can cause total rot and structural failure of roots and subterranean storage organs. Impact of violet root rot on crop loss is often due to stunting of above ground plant growth and decreased vigor, and in extreme cases, whole plant death. It does not directly infect above ground organs. Violet root rot can also damage or cause the death of subterranean storage organs such as potato tubers or carrots.

Disease cycle 
Helicobasidium longisporum is a soil borne pathogen. The pathogen overwinters both as sclerotia and via mycelium; basidiospores are not known to play a significant role in the disease cycle. Fall sclerotia production is initiated by nutrient deficits, in the early growing season when the host and moisture are present again the sclerotia will resume growth and infection of the host. Sclerotia are dispersed through movement in irrigation or rain water, particularly of note where flood irrigation is used. H. longisporum will grow as an independent, whitish mycelium for the first part of the growing season, gradually darkening from pink to a dark violet brown as infection progresses mid-season.

Infection occurs via an external infection cushion from which penetrating hyphae infest the lamellae of root tissues, where it causes damage. The dark pigment found in H. longisporum is helicobasidin and can be toxic to some plants and microorganisms.

Hosts and symptoms 
The most indicative sign is the presence of dark fungal mats on the effected plant’s roots and stem near the soil line, and the presence of mycelium on the soil. H. longisporum is an opportunistic parasite of subterranean plant organs. Symptoms of infection include foliage chlorosis, premature abscission, wilting, and severe reduction of root mass. Infected soil may be identified by the conspicuous nature of the webbed mycelium, which transitions from white to dark violet over the growing season.

It is not highly specialized and infects a wide range of hosts, among them including apple (Malus domestica), mulberry (Morus spp.), Grapes (Vitus spp.), Potato (Solanum tuberosum), Plum (Prunus spp.), Tea, beets, soy, and cotton. It is suspected to infect many more hosts and is not selective.

Management 
This disease is not highly present outside of China, Japan, India, the Korean Peninsula and Taiwan, and is mostly controlled through cultural means. Resistant varieties can be an effective method to stifle disease progress, as well as early maturing annual crops which avoid infection altogether. Harvesting before the fungus has a chance to infect the crop is also a viable option. As cereal grains are not affected by H. longisporum, long rotations with grains can reduce incidence. The fungus requires ample moisture, warm soil temperatures (20-30 °C) and low pH to thrive, drip irrigation and regular lime applications can serve to reduce the fungal presence.

References 

Fungal plant pathogens and diseases
Teliomycotina
Fungi described in 1917